Zhu Jun or Jun Zhu may refer to:

Zhu Jun (Han dynasty) (died 195), Han dynasty general and official
Zhu Jun (fencer) (born 1984), Chinese foil fencer
Zhu Jun (host), Chinese TV host
Zhu Jun (businessman) (born 1966), Chinese businessman and chairman of Shanghai Shenhua F.C.
Jun Zhu, American statistician and entomologist
Jun Zhu (physicist), Chinese-American condensed matter physicist